The 2016 BMW Open was a men's tennis tournament played on outdoor clay courts. It was the 101st edition of the event, and part of the ATP World Tour 250 series of the 2016 ATP World Tour. It took place at the MTTC Iphitos complex in Munich, Germany, from 25 April through 1 May 2016. Fourth-seeded Philipp Kohlschreiber won the singles title.

Singles main draw entrants

Seeds

 Rankings are as of April 18, 2016.

Other entrants
The following players received wildcards into the main draw:
  Juan Martín del Potro
  Maximilian Marterer
  Mischa Zverev

The following players received entry from the qualifying draw:
  Matthias Bachinger
  Florian Mayer
  Igor Sijsling
  Cedrik-Marcel Stebe

The following player received entry as a lucky loser:
  Jozef Kovalík

Withdrawals
Before the tournament
  Marcos Baghdatis → replaced by  Santiago Giraldo 
  Roberto Bautista Agut → replaced by  Marco Cecchinato
  Simone Bolelli → replaced by  Mikhail Kukushkin
  Jérémy Chardy → replaced by  Dustin Brown
  Gaël Monfils → replaced by  Jozef Kovalík

Retirements
  Evgeny Donskoy
  Mikhail Youzhny

Doubles main draw entrants

Seeds

 Rankings are as of April 18, 2016.

Other entrants
The following pairs received wildcards into the doubles main draw:
  Kevin Krawietz /  Maximilian Marterer
  Alexander Zverev /  Mischa Zverev

Finals

Singles

  Philipp Kohlschreiber defeated  Dominic Thiem, 7–6(9–7), 4–6, 7–6(7–4)

Doubles

  Henri Kontinen /  John Peers defeated  Juan Sebastián Cabal /  Robert Farah, 6–3, 3–6, [10–7]

References

External links
Official website